Dumbrăveni may refer to several places in Romania:

 Dumbrăveni, Sibiu County, a town
 Dumbrăveni, a commune in Constanța County
 Dumbrăveni, a commune in Suceava County
 Dumbrăveni, a commune in Vrancea County
 Dumbrăveni, a village in Ciceu-Giurgești Commune, Bistrița-Năsăud County
 Dumbrăveni, a village in Crasna Commune, Gorj County
 Dumbrăveni, a village in Balotești Commune, Ilfov County
 Dumbrăveni, a village in Râșca Commune, Suceava County
 Dumbrăveni, a village in Gârceni Commune, Vaslui County

and to:
 Dumbrăveni, a village in Vădeni Commune, Soroca district, Moldova

See also
 
 Dumbrava (disambiguation)
 Dumbrăvița (disambiguation)